The Welsh Highland Heritage Railway is a short reconstructed heritage railway in Gwynedd, Wales. Its main station is in Porthmadog.

History
The origins of the WHHR lie in a small group of railway enthusiasts, including some disgruntled volunteers from the Festiniog Railway, forming the Welsh Highland Railway Society in 1961, to preserve and rebuild the original Welsh Highland Railway which had operated from 1922 to 1936. 

Land running alongside the Cambrian Coast line at Beddgelert Siding was acquired from British Railways in December 1972. Work started on construction of the railway in 1973. A substantial works and engineering facility was constructed on the site of the former farm that was situated in the triangle of land between the Beddgelert Siding, the Cambrian Coast Railway and the original Welsh Highland Railway trackbed. The works have been expanded with newly constructed sheds and the re-use of some of the original agricultural buildings, which include one of the oldest buildings in Porthmadog. A museum of narrow gauge railways is part to the works tour and from 2009, with the construction of a new building, this has more than doubled in size.

The original Welsh Highland Railway has been reconstructed by the Festiniog Railway Company and the Welsh Highland Railway Limited.

Present

The railway is mostly run by volunteers, who operate the trains and maintain the railway and its infrastructure.

In 2014, Russell the only steam loco to survive from the original WHR, returned to service after a major overhaul costing about £250,000. Russell had been out of service since 2003.

Operations
The railway currently operates trains from March to November from their main station, which is located opposite the Network Rail station in Porthmadog on Tremadog Road. On the return journey, the train stops at Gelert's Farm halt, allowing passengers to visit the museum and a  gauge miniature railway.

This line was built as part of an agreement signed in 1998 with the Ffestiniog Railway and allowed WHR Ltd. to run on the original Welsh Highland Railway trackbed for the first time. As part of the agreement, the section closed and became a construction site when the Ffestiniog Railway constructed WHR mainline from Caernarvon was connected in 2008.

Stations

Porthmadog (WHHR)
Gelerts Farm Works Halt
Pen-y-Mount Junction railway station
Traeth Mawr Loop (no passenger access - Temporary 2007–2008)

Rolling stock

See also
 British narrow-gauge railways
 South African Class NG 15 2-8-2

References

Further reading

Videos
Train going through Cynfal Crossing
 Opening of Traeth Mawr Part 1 Part 2 Part 3 Part 4 Part 5
Pen-y-Mount

External links

 
 More technical and historical information
 Welsh Highland Railway - official site
 The Welsh Highland Railway Project - official construction site
 Welsh Highland Railway - unofficial construction site
 The Pont Croesor Extension
 Welsh Highland Railway History
 Live.com map of route

Porthmadog
Heritage railways in Gwynedd
Narrow gauge railways in Gwynedd
Slate industry in Wales
1 ft 11½ in gauge railways in Wales